|}

The Hugh McMahon Memorial Novice Chase is a Grade 3 National Hunt novice steeplechase in Ireland which is open to horses aged five years or older. 
It is run at Limerick over a distance of about 3 miles (4,828 metres), and during its running there are 16 fences to be jumped. It is scheduled to take place each year in late March or early April.

The race was awarded Grade 3 status in 2007 and raised to Grade 2 status the following year.

Records
Leading jockey (5 wins):
 Ruby Walsh -  Scarthy Lad (2005), Candy Girl (2008), Val De Ferbet (2015), Avant Tout (2016), Burrows Saint (2019) 

Leading trainer (6 wins):
 Willie Mullins -  Candy Girl (2008), Touch The Eden (2014), Val De Ferbet (2015), Avant Tout (2016), Kemboy (2018), Burrows Saint (2019)

Winners since 2003

See also 
 Horse racing in Ireland
 List of Irish National Hunt races

References
Racing Post

National Hunt races in Ireland
National Hunt chases
Limerick Racecourse